Empress Wang (王皇后, given name unknown) (942–963) was a Chinese empress consort of the Song dynasty, married to Emperor Taizu of Song.

Titles
During the reign of Emperor Gaozu of Later Jin (28 November 936 – 28 July 942):
Lady Wang (王氏; from 942)
During the reign of Emperor Shizong of Later Zhou (26 February 954 – 27 July 959):
Second Wife (為繼室; from 958)
Lady of Langxie State (琅邪郡夫人; form unknown dare)
During the reign of Emperor Taizu of Song (4 February 960– 14 November 976):
Empress (賀氏; 4 February 960)
Empress Xiàomíng (孝明皇后; from 964)

Issue
As Second Wife: 
 Zhao Defang, Prince Qinkanghui (959 – 981)
 Unnamed daughter
 Unnamed daughter

Notes and references

Sources
  

963 deaths
Song dynasty empresses
942 births
10th-century Chinese women
10th-century Chinese people
People from Xianyang